Mario Williams (born 19 August 1992) is a Barbadian professional footballer who  plays as a defensive midfielder for Weymouth Wales.

Club career

Macarthur FC
Williams joined Macarthur FC in September 2022.

External links

References

Living people
1992 births
Macarthur FC players
Barbadian footballers
Barbados international footballers
Barbadian expatriate footballers
Expatriate footballers in Antigua and Barbuda
Expatriate soccer players in Australia
Weymouth Wales FC players
Barbados Defence Force SC players
Paradise FC (Barbados) players
Parham F.C. players
Association football midfielders